The Oprichnik or The Guardsman is an opera in 4 acts, 5 scenes, by Pyotr Ilyich Tchaikovsky to his own libretto after the tragedy The Oprichniks by Ivan Lazhechnikov (1792–1869). The subject of the opera is the oprichniks. It is set in Ivan the Terrible's court during the oprichnina times (1565–1573).

Tchaikovsky worked on the opera from February 1870 - March 1872. It includes music from  his early opera The Voyevoda (1869). The work is dedicated to the Grand Duke Konstantin Nikolayevich Romanov. It was given its premiere performance at the Mariinsky Theatre in St Petersburg on 24 April 1874, followed by the Moscow premiere on 16 May 1874 at the Bolshoi Theatre.

Roles

Instrumentation
Source: Tchaikovsky Research
Strings: Violins I, Violins II, Violas, Cellos, and Double Basses
Woodwinds: Piccolo, 2 Flutes, 2 Oboes, 2 Clarinets (1 in B-flat, 1 in A), 2 bassoons
Brass: 4 Horns (in F), 2 Trumpets (in D, F, and C), 3 Trombones, Tuba
Percussion: Timpani, Triangle, Cymbals, Bass Drum
Other: Harp

Synopsis

Introduction.

Act 1
No. 1 — Scena
No. 2 — Chorus of Maidens
No. 2a – Natalya's Song
No. 3 — Scena & Chorus
No. 4 — Scena & Chorus
No. 5 — Recitatives
No. 5a – Basmanov's Arioso
No. 6 — Natalya's Arioso
No. 6a – Chorus of Maidens

Act 2
Entr'acte
No. 7 — Scena & Morozova's Aria
No. 8 — Scena & Duet
No. 9 — Prelude, Scena & Finale
No. 9a – Prince Vyazminsky's Aria
No. 9b – Andrey's Aria

Act 3
Entr'acte
No. 10 - Chorus of People
No. 11 - Recitatives, Chorus of Boys & Duet
No. 12 - Scena
No. 12a-Natalya's Arioso
No. 13 - Finale

Act 4
No. 14 - Wedding Chorus
No. 15 - Dances of Oprichniks & Women
No. 16 - Recitatives, Chorus & Duet
No. 17 - Chorus & Scena
No. 18 - Scena & Quartet
No. 19 - Closing Scena

Note: The entr'acte to Act II may have been written and scored by Vladimir Shilovsky.

Derived works
Arrangements by the composer

Numbers from the opera for voices with piano accompaniment (1873)
Funeral March on Themes from the Opera The Oprichnik (1877, lost)

Recordings
1948, Alexei Korolyov (Prince Zhemchuzny), Natalya Rozhdestvenskaya (Natalya), Vsevolod Tyutyunnik (Molchan Mitkov), Lyudmila Legostayeva (Boyarina Morozova), Dmitri Tarkhov (Andrei Morozov), Zara Dolukhanova (Basmanov), Konstantin Polyaev (Prince Vyazminsky), Antonina Kleschtschova (Zakharyevna). Moscow Radio Choir and Orchestra, Aleksander Orlov (conductor). Melodiya, reissued Pristine Classics
1980, Evgeny Vladimirov (Prince Zhemchuzny), Tamara Milashkina (Natalya), Vladimir Matorin (Molchan Mitkov), Larisa Nikitina (Boyarina Morozova), Lev Kuznetsov (Andrei Morozov), Raisa Kotova (Basmanov), Oleg Klyonov (Prince Vyazminsky), Nina Derbina (Zakharyevna). Chorus and Orchestra of the Central Television and Radio of the USSR, Gennady Provatorov (conductor). Aquarius.
2003, Vassily Savenko (Prince Zhemchuzhny), Elena Lassoskaya (Natalya), Dmitri Ulyanov (Molchan Mitkov), Irina Dolzhenko (Boyarina Morozova), Vsevolod Grivnov (Andrei Morozov), Alexandra Durseneva (Basmanov), Vladimir Ognovienko (Prince Vyazminsky), Cinzia de Mola (Zakharyevna). Orchestra e Coro del Teatro Lirico di Cagliari, Gennady Rozhdestvensky (conductor). Dynamic, reissued Brilliant.

References

External links
 
 Tchaikovsky Research

Operas by Pyotr Ilyich Tchaikovsky
Russian-language operas
Operas
1874 operas
Operas based on plays
Operas set in Russia